Mason-Dorton School, also known as Mason's Store School and Dorton School, is a historic school building located at Castlewood, Russell County, Virginia. It was built in 1885, and is a one-story, two room, frame building.  It measures approximately 46 feet by 24 feet.  The school has a gable roof and is sheathed in weatherboard.  The school closed in 1958.

It was listed on the National Register of Historic Places in 2002.

References

School buildings on the National Register of Historic Places in Virginia
School buildings completed in 1885
Buildings and structures in Russell County, Virginia
National Register of Historic Places in Russell County, Virginia